Season 2014–15 saw Greenock Morton compete in the Scottish League One the third tier of Scottish football, having finished bottom of the Scottish Championship in 2013-14. Morton will also compete in the Challenge Cup, Scottish League Cup and the Scottish Cup.

Morton won the championship on the final day of the regular season, on 2 May 2015, with a 3-1 victory over Peterhead.

Story of the season

May
Kenny Shiels resigned as manager at the end of the previous season.

Marc Fitzpatrick left the club to look for a part-time club.

Morton appointed Clyde manager Jim Duffy as the replacement for Kenny Shiels. Duffy signed a two-year contract with the club.

Young defender Nicky Jamieson left to take up an accountancy apprenticeship with Ernst & Young.

Ten of the club's youth players signed new full-time contracts. Luke Irvine, Steven Lamont and Aidan Ferris were given six-month extensions, while Jordan Cairnie, Cameron O'Neil, Craig Knight, Lewis McIntyre, John Tennant, Dylan Stevenson and Thomas Orr penned two-year deals.

Derek Gaston agreed a new one-year deal with the club. Thomas O'Ware followed suit.

June

Ex-Ton midfielder Craig McPherson signed a two-year contract to become Jim Duffy's assistant.

Captain Dougie Imrie left the club to re-join Hamilton Academical after turning down a contract extension.

Morton re-signed Mark Russell on a two-year deal, whilst Stefan Milojević and Conor Pepper verbally agreed terms.

Scott Taggart left the club after rejecting a new deal.

Morton agreed terms with two more players, Michael Miller from Celtic, and ex-Hamilton Accies defender Lee Kilday. Kilday signed, along with Sean Crighton who was already working at the club as a youth coach.

Stefan Milojević, Conor Pepper and Stefan McCluskey all signed for the club.

Andrew Barrowman started training with the club.

July

Morton were drawn against Lowland Football League champions Spartans in the first round of the Scottish Challenge Cup.

Barrowman became the first new striker to sign with the club.

Morton received a second home cup tie of the season with a game against Berwick Rangers.

Morton defeated Viewfield Rovers 13-1 to confirm their place in the Renfrewshire Cup final. Barrowman scored a hat-trick, with Mark Russell and Joe McKee getting braces.

Morton signed trialist duo Jordan Allan and Ricki Lamie, as well as re-signing David McNeil, on short-term contracts.

Ex-St Mirren youth striker Jon Scullion signed a 6-month contract with the club.

After defeating Spartans in the first round, Morton received another home tie against Berwick Rangers in the second round of the Challenge Cup.

Stefan McCluskey's brother Jamie signed on a one-month contract, rejecting offers from India and Cyprus.

August
Morton drew Partick Thistle at home in the second round of the League Cup.

Declan McManus signed on loan from Aberdeen until 6 January 2015.

Fouad Bachirou made a move to Swedish second tier side Östersunds FK for an undisclosed fee.

After defeating Berwick in extra time in round 2, Morton were given a fifth successive home tie with a quarter final clash against Alloa Athletic.

Jamie McCluskey signed a contract extension to tie him to the club until the end of the season.

September
Morton signed Rangers midfielder Robbie Crawford on a four-month loan spell.

Declan McManus received his first call-up to the Scotland U21 side.

Aidan Fulton was officially released by the club after failing to win a deal over the summer.

October
Aidan Ferris was loaned out to Lowland League side BSC Glasgow.

In the Scottish Cup third round, drawn by Billy Connolly, Morton were given a home tie against Airdrieonians; whilst they were drawn away to Raith Rovers in the Scottish Youth Cup.

Third-choice goalkeeper Lewis McIntyre asked to be released from his contract.

November
After defeating Raith 5-0, Morton were given a home draw in the fourth round of the Scottish Youth Cup.

Defender Luke Irvine (18) and goalkeeper Jamie McGowan (17) signed new 18-month contracts with the club's development squad.

Morton were eliminated from the Scottish Cup at the fourth round stage by Spartans; this was their first ever defeat against non-league opposition.

December
Grant Adam was brought in as a trialist after injuries to Derek Gaston and Nicolas Caraux.

Morton were eliminated on penalties from the Scottish Youth Cup by bogey side Queen's Park.

Jim Duffy was named as League One manager of the month for November 2014.

Jon Scullion and Ricki Lamie were given contract extensions until the end of the season.

January
Reece Hands was released by mutual consent.

Morton signed trialist goalkeeper Grant Adam as well as strikers Peter MacDonald and Ross Caldwell.

Andrew Barrowman was also released by mutual consent to sign for Dunfermline Athletic in a swap deal with Ross Forbes.

Aidan Ferris was given a contract until the end of the season after returning from a successful loan spell in Glasgow, Steven Lamont from the under-20s squad was also released, as were Jordan Allan and David McNeil.

David Hopkin left his post as reserve team manager to become assistant head coach at Livingston to Mark Burchill.

18 months after leaving for £50,000, Michael Tidser returned to the club on a free transfer, signing a 2-and-a-half year contract. FIFA rules prevent him from playing for the club until next season however as he has already played for Rotherham and Oldham this season.

February
Top scorer Declan McManus returned on loan for the rest of the season after failing to get any playing time back at Pittodrie.

Captain Peter MacDonald was ruled out after undergoing a back procedure to alleviate the pain of a bulging disc.

Gary McCann of junior side Irvine Meadow played as a trialist against Ayr United U20s.

Morton came to agreements with several junior sides to farm the development squad out to get first team experience whilst still being eligible to play for the U20s during the week.

March
Another two youngsters went out on loan to junior sides.

Luke Irvine also joined Port Glasgow on loan.

Mark Russell was told by the chairman that he would be offered a new improved contract.

April
Declan McManus was nominated for PFA Scotland League One Player of the Year.

Morton finished third in the Development League West with a victory over Queens Park, and the U17s won the Club Academy Scotland U16/17 South/West League with a 3-1 win against Ayr United.

May
Declan McManus and Mark Russell were announced as being included in the PFA Scotland League One Team of the Year.

Morton finished the season as champions, defeating Peterhead by three goals to one; goals being scored by Mark Russell, Declan McManus and Michael Miller

McManus won the PFA Scotland League One Player of the Year award.

First team transfers
From end of 2013-14 season, to last match of season 2014-15

In

Out

Squad (that played for first team)

Fixtures and results

Pre-season

Friendlies

Renfrewshire Cup

Scottish League One

Scottish Cup

Scottish League Cup

Scottish Challenge Cup

Development squad

Friendlies

Development League West

Scottish Youth Cup

League table

Player statistics

All competitions
Additional positions played listed, if have started in more than one this season.

Development squad goalscorers

Including goals from the Development League West and SFA Youth Cup

Thomas Orr - 15
Jon Scullion - 11
David McNeil - 7
Jordan Allan, Jordan Cairnie & Aidan Ferris - 3
Cameron O'Neil, Stefan McCluskey & Reece Hands - 2
Joe McKee, Sean Crighton, Dylan Stevenson, Scott Tiffoney, Mark Russell, Scott Miller, Michael Tidser, John Mitchell & Alex McWaters - 1

Awards

Last updated 25 April 2014

References

Greenock Morton F.C. seasons
Greenock Morton